Chay may refer to:

Places
 Chay, Doubs, a commune in eastern France
 Chay, Russia, a rural locality in Vilyuysky District, Sakha Republic, Russia

People
 Chay (given name)
 Chay Weng Yew (1928–2004), Singaporean weightlifter
 Jean-Yves Chay (born 1948), French football manager
 Chay Wai Chuen (born 1950), Singaporean politician
 Chay Yew (born 1965), American playwright
 Mark Chay (born 1982), Singaporean swimmer
 Chesster Chay (born 1989), Filipino actor
 Chay (footballer) (Chayene Medeiros Oliveira Santos; born 1990), Brazilian footballer

Other uses
 CHAY-FM, a Canadian radio station based in Ontario
 Chay, a name for tea in several languages
 Chay, an alternative name for chaise
 Chay root (Oldenlandia umbellata), used as a source of red pigment

See also
 Chai (disambiguation)
 Chaya (disambiguation)